Yvonne Margarula is an Aboriginal Australian environmentalist who won the 1998 Friends of the Earth International Environment Award and the 1998 Nuclear-Free Future Award.  She also won the 1999 US Goldman Environmental Prize, with Jacqui Katona, in recognition of efforts to protect their country and culture against uranium mining.

Protests
The Mirrar, an Aboriginal Australian people, led by Margarula and Katona, mounted a large campaign in opposition to the proposed Jabiluka uranium mine in the Northern Territory of Australia.  They used legal action and education to gain national and international support.  In March 1998 the Mirarr, together with environmental organizations, used massive on-site civil disobedience to create one of the largest blockades in Australia's history. Over several months, approximately 5,000 people from across Australia and around the world travelled to the remote camp to protest with the Mirarr people. In July the land was cleared by Energy Resources of Australia and construction of the entrance to the Jabiluka mine began; however, protesters intervened and about 550 were arrested, including Margarula and Katona.

In 2011, Margarula wrote a public letter to Ban Ki Moon, Secretary General of the United Nations, expressing sorrow that uranium from Mirarr land was used in the Fukushima plant.

See also
List of Australian inquiries into uranium mining
List of Nuclear-Free Future Award recipients
Uranium in the environment
Uranium mining in Kakadu National Park
Women and the environment through history

References

External links
Aborigines count cost of mine

Australian environmentalists
Australian women environmentalists
Australian indigenous rights activists
Women human rights activists
Australian women activists
Australian anti-uranium activists
Living people
Year of birth missing (living people)
Goldman Environmental Prize awardees